Central Region, Center Region, Centrale Region, or Centre Region can refer to:

Africa 
Centre Region, Burkina Faso, one of 13 administrative regions
Centre Region, Cameroon, one of ten semi-autonomous regions
Maekel Region or Central Region, Eritrea, one of six regions
Central Region, Ghana, one of ten regions
Central Region, Malawi, one of three regions
Central Region, Uganda, one of four regions into which the districts are grouped
Central Regions State, Somalia
Centrale Region, Togo, one of five regions
Middle Belt, the central region of Nigeria.

Americas 
AAA Central Region, a high school sports region in the U.S. state of Virginia
Center Region, Argentina, one of several geographical regions
Central Region, Venezuela
Central Region (Boy Scouts of America)

Asia 
Central Region, Nepal, one of five development regions
Central Region, Singapore, one of five regions
Central Region within the Yuan dynasty governed by the Zhongshu Sheng

Europe 
Centre region, Hainaut, an informal region in the province of Hainaut, which is part of the region of Wallonia, Belgium
Centre-Val de Loire, before 2015 Centre, France
Central Region, Malta, one of five regions of Malta
Central Region, Portugal, a region of Portugal
Central Region, Scotland, one of nine former local government regions
Central Region, Serbia, a former statistical region, now part of Šumadija and Western Serbia statistical region

See also
Eastern Region (disambiguation)
Northern Region (disambiguation)
Southern Region (disambiguation)
Western Region (disambiguation)